Bonnie Scotland is a 1935 American film directed by James W. Horne and starring Laurel and Hardy. It was produced by Hal Roach for Hal Roach Studios. Although the film begins in Scotland, a large part of the action is set in British India.

Plot
After escaping from jail where they had "one more week to serve," Laurel and Hardy travel to Scotland as stowaways on a cattle boat, where Laurel (as "Stanley McLaurel") believes he is heir to his grandfather's fortune. As it turns out, Laurel has only been bequeathed a set of bagpipes and a snuff container. Use of the latter causes Hardy, trying to demonstrate to Laurel the proper way to use snuff, to fly off an old bridge. His clothes are soaked.

In the boarding house, Laurel swaps their overcoats for a large fish for dinner. In quick succession the fish "shrizzles" to about 1/10 its size, Hardy's pants are burnt and ruined, and an attempt to hide the still-hot stove results in the landlady throwing the two out and confiscating their luggage for non-payment of rent. Receiving an ad for a tailor's offer of a new suit, Laurel and Hardy accidentally go to the wrong floor and join a Scottish regiment of the British Army and travel to India, where they frequently run afoul of their Sergeant Major (Jimmy Finlayson), and help their friend Alan (William Janney) reunite with his love (and Laurel's cousin) Lorna McLaurel (June Lang).

Khan Mir Jutra is the local terrorist who is a grave danger to the regiment. Volunteers are sought for a dangerous decoy mission to his palace, while Colonel MacGregor leads a surprise attack from another direction. Finlayson "volunteers" Stan & Ollie, who remain blissfully ignorant of the danger until they are given pistols and ordered to commit suicide. Hardy instead shoots down a huge chandelier, and also leads their pursuers into a courtyard of beehives, which cause panic among the terrorists and their own arriving regiment.

Cast

References

External links 

 
 
 
 
 

1935 films
1935 comedy films
American black-and-white films
Films directed by James W. Horne
Films set in India
Films set in Scotland
Films set in the British Raj
Laurel and Hardy (film series)
Metro-Goldwyn-Mayer films
Films with screenplays by Charley Rogers
1930s English-language films
1930s American films